Dielsiochloa is a genus of South American plants in the grass family. The only known species is Dielsiochloa floribunda, native to Bolivia (Potosí, La Paz), Peru (Ancash, Huancavelica, Junín, Moquegua, Tacna, Puno), northwestern Argentina (Jujuy, La Rioja), and northern Chile (Antofagasta, Tarapacá).

References

External links 
 Grassbase - The World Online Grass Flora

Pooideae
Monotypic Poaceae genera
Flora of South America